Rudolf Größwang (born 1 April 1947) is a West German former luger who competed in the 1970s. He won two bronze medals in the men's doubles event at the FIL European Luge Championships (1972, 1977).

Größwang also finished fourth in the men's doubles event at the 1976 Winter Olympics in Innsbruck.

His best overall Luge World Cup finish was third in men's doubles in the 1977-8 inaugural season.

After retiring from luge, Größwang formed Rudi Größwang Services (RGS), a marketing firm in Germany that has been involved in the marketing of the International Luge Federation (FIL) since the mid-1990s. This includes partnering with FIL's longtime sponsors Viessmann and Eberspächer.

References
1976 Winter Olympic men's doubles results.
FIL-Luge news on Größwang's 60th birthday in 2007 and his marketing firm
List of European luge champions 
List of men's doubles luge World Cup champions since 1978.

1947 births
Living people
German male lugers
Lugers at the 1976 Winter Olympics
Olympic lugers of West Germany